Majestical Parade is Nightmare's sixth full-length studio album. Three different versions of this album were released: one with just the CD; one with a CD+DVD; and one with a CD+DVD and a photo book. The sixth song, MELODY, was released as a limited single download on the DWANGO homepage. The album reached #3 in the Oricon Charts.

Track listing

Single Information

Lost in Blue
Released: September 17, 2008
Peak Chart Position: #4
NAKED LOVE
Released: December 3, 2008
Peak Chart Position: #5
MELODY
Released: April 29, 2009
Internet only release, did not chart.

"Lost in Blue" and "NAKED LOVE" were used as the opening and ending theme to "Moryo no Hako" respectively.

Musicians
Tomiyasu Tohru - Drums Tuner
Tooru Yoshida - Keyboards
Sasaki Shiro - Arrangement Horn, Trumpet
Kazuki Katsuta - Tenor Sax
KAWAI Wakaba - Trombone
Miwa Gardner - Female Vocals
Shinobu - Manipulator
Takayuki Kurihara - Manipulator

References

External links
 
 

2009 albums
Nightmare (Japanese band) albums
Japanese-language albums